Russell Wayne Baker (August 14, 1925 – January 21, 2019) was an American journalist, narrator, writer of Pulitzer Prize-winning satirical commentary and self-critical prose, and author of Pulitzer Prize-winning autobiography Growing Up (1983). He was a columnist for The New York Times from 1962 to 1998, and hosted the PBS show Masterpiece Theatre from 1992 to 2004. The Forbes Media Guide Five Hundred, 1994 stated: "Baker, thanks to his singular gift of treating serious, even tragic events and trends with gentle humor, has become an American institution."

Background
Born in Loudoun County, Virginia, Baker was the son of Benjamin Rex Baker and Lucy Elizabeth (née Robinson). At the age of eleven, as a self-professed "bump on a log," Baker decided to become a writer since he figured "what writers did couldn't even be classified as work." After leaving school, he took a scholarship to Johns Hopkins University in 1942, studying for a year before leaving to join the Navy as a trainee pilot. He left in 1945, continuing his degree in English at Johns Hopkins University, graduating with a bachelor's degree in 1947.

Career

Journalism

Shortly after leaving college, Baker took a job at The Baltimore Sun as a night police reporter, working his way up to be sent to London as a correspondent for the paper in 1952, and then White House Correspondent shortly thereafter.

Columnist

After covering the White House, United States Congress, and the United States Department of State for The New York Times for eight years, Baker wrote the nationally syndicated Observer column for the newspaper from 1962 to 1998; initially oriented toward politics, the column began to encompass other subjects after he relocated to New York City in 1974. During his long career as an essayist, journalist, and biographer, he was a regular contributor to national periodicals such as The New York Times Magazine, Sports Illustrated, The Saturday Evening Post, and McCalls. He was elected a Fellow of the American Academy of Arts and Sciences in 1993.

Writer

Baker wrote or edited seventeen books. Baker's first Pulitzer Prize was awarded to him for distinguished commentary for his Observer columns (1979) and the second one was for his autobiography, Growing Up (1982); he is one of only six people to have been awarded a Pulitzer Prize for both Arts & Letters (for his autobiography) and Journalism (for his column). He wrote a sequel to his autobiography in 1989, called The Good Times. His other works include An American in Washington (1961), No Cause for Panic (1964), Poor Russell's Almanac (1972), Looking Back: Heroes, Rascals, and Other Icons of the American Imagination (2002), and various anthologies of his columns. He edited the anthologies The Norton Book of Light Verse (1986) and Russell Baker's Book of American Humor (1993).

Baker wrote the libretto for the 1979 musical play Home Again, Home Again, starring Ronny Cox, with music by Cy Coleman, lyrics by Barbara Fried, choreography by Onna White, and direction by Gene Saks. After an unsuccessful tryout at the American Shakespeare Theatre in Stratford, Connecticut, the show closed in Toronto and never made it to Broadway. "That was a great experience," Baker said in a 1994 interview with the Hartford Courant. "Truly dreadful, but fun. I was sorry [the show] folded because I was having such a good time. But once is enough."

Television host and narrator

In 1993, Baker replaced Alistair Cooke as the regular host of the PBS television series Masterpiece Theatre. "That's talking-head stuff," he said. "Television is harder than I thought it was. I can't bear to look at myself. I fancied that I was an exceedingly charming, witty and handsome young man, and here's this fidgeting old fellow whose hair is parted on the wrong side."

In 1995, he narrated the Ric Burns documentary The Way West for The American Experience on PBS.

Personal life and death

In 1950, Baker married Miriam Nash, who died in 2015. The couple had four children, Allen, Kasia, Michael, and Phyllis.

Baker died at his home in Leesburg, Virginia, on January 21, 2019, after complications following a fall. He was 93.

Legacy

Neil Postman, in the preface to Conscientious Objections, described Baker as "like some fourth century citizen of Rome who is amused and intrigued by the Empire's collapse but who still cares enough to mock the stupidities that are hastening its end. He is, in my opinion, a precious national resource, and as long as he does not get his own television show, America will remain stronger than Russia." (1991, xii)

Awards and honors
1978 – George Polk Award for Commentary
1979 – Pulitzer Prize Winner in Commentary
1983 – Pulitzer Prize Winner in Biography
1993 – Golden Plate Award of the American Academy of Achievement
1998 – George Polk Award for Career Achievements
Baltimore City College Hall of Fame

References

External links

 Baker author page from New York Review Books
 Baker article archive from New York Review Books
 

1925 births
2019 deaths
American essayists
American memoirists
American humorists
Pulitzer Prize for Biography or Autobiography winners
Pulitzer Prize for Commentary winners
American television personalities
Members of the American Academy of Arts and Letters
Writers from Virginia
Johns Hopkins University alumni
People from Belleville, New Jersey
People from Leesburg, Virginia
The Baltimore Sun people
George Polk Award recipients
Baltimore City College alumni
The New York Times columnists
Fellows of the American Academy of Arts and Sciences
Journalists from Virginia
Journalists from New Jersey
Military personnel from Virginia